The Oberliga Hamburg/Schleswig-Holstein was the fourth tier of the German football league system in the north of Germany, existing from 1994 to 2004. It covered the states of Hamburg and Schleswig-Holstein. With the re-formation of the Oberliga Nord in 2004, the league was disbanded.

Overview

The Oberliga Hamburg/Schleswig-Holstein started out in 1994 as a replacement for the Oberliga Nord, which was disbanded in that year. Along with this league, the Oberliga Niedersachsen/Bremen was formed to cover the other two of the four states the Oberliga Nord previously had served. The reason for the disbanding of the Oberliga Nord and the creation of two separate leagues in its stead was the formation of the Regionalliga Nord, which became the new third tier of league football in the north and covered exactly the same region as the Oberliga previously.

The league was formed from sixteen clubs, with eight of them coming from the Verbandsliga Schleswig-Holstein, seven from the Verbandsliga Hamburg and one from the Oberliga Nord.

For the duration of the league's existence, it was fed by the two Verbandsligas of Hamburg and Schleswig-Holstein with the winners of these leagues gaining direct promotion to the Oberliga.

The winner of the Oberliga was directly promoted to the Regionalliga from 1995 to 1999. In 2000, no promotion was available due to changes in the league system. From 2001 to 2004, the league champion had to play-off for promotion with the winner of the Oberliga Niedersachsen/Bremen. The first three years, the winner of this league won this contest, only in 2004 gained the Oberliga Niedersachsen/Bremen champion the upper hand.

In 2000, with the reduction of the number of Regionalligas to two, eight clubs were relegated from this league to the Oberligas and the league expanded to eighteen teams. The Regionalliga Nord now covered the complete northern half of Germany, not just the traditional region of the Oberliga Nord.

On these grounds it was decided in 2004 to reform a united Oberliga Nord which allowed direct promotion to its champion to the Regionalliga. The Oberliga Hamburg/Schleswig-Holstein was therefore disbanded. The clubs placed first to eighth were admitted to the new Oberliga. The other ten clubs in the league were relegated to the Verbandsligas.

In 2008, with the introduction of the new 3. Liga, the Oberliga Nord was disbanded again. The Oberligas Niedersachsen/Bremen and Hamburg/Schleswig-Holstein however were not reformed. Below the Regionalliga Nord the five Verbandsligas in the north functioned as the next level of play, making it the only region, until 2012, without an Oberliga and without direct promotion to the Regionalliga.

League champions
The league champions:

The FC St. Pauli II was ineligible for promotion in 2003 as their first team was relegated to the Regionalliga. VfR Neumünster, the runners-up, was promoted instead.

Placings in the league from 1994 to 2004 
The complete list of clubs in the league and their final placings:

 1 FC Altona 93 withdrew its team to the Verbandsliga in 1997.
 2 VfL 93 Hamburg withdrew its team to the Verbandsliga in 1998.
 3 TSV Pansdorf withdrew its team from the league in 2000.
 4 TuS Hoisdorf and TuS Felde withdrew their teams from the league in 2001.
 5 1. SC Norderstedt, Eichholzer SV and TSV Lägersdorf withdrew their teams from the league in 2002.
 6 TSV Altenholz withdrew its team from the league in 2003.

Key

Founding members of the league
The league was formed from sixteen clubs from two states in 1994, those being:

From the Oberliga Nord:
1. SC Norderstedt

From the Verbandsliga Hamburg:
ASV Bergedorf 
FC St. Pauli II
VfL Pinneberg 
Barsbütteler SV 
Harburger TB 
FC Altona 93 
SV Halstenbek-Rellingen

From the Verbandsliga Schleswig-Holstein:
Holstein Kiel II 
Heider SV 
SV Sereetz 
TSV Pansdorf 
1. FC Phönix Lübeck 
Itzehoer SV 
TSB Flensburg 
SpVgg Flensburg 08

Disbanding of the league
The league was disbanded in 2004 and replaced by the Oberliga Nord. Its clubs were spread between the Oberliga Nord and the two Verbandsligas:

To the Oberliga Nord:
Holstein Kiel II 
FC Altona 93 
Concordia Hamburg 
Meiendorfer SV 
FC St. Pauli II
ASV Bergedorf 85 
FT Eider Büdelsdorf 
SC Victoria Hamburg

To the Verbandsliga Hamburg:
SV Lurup
VfL Pinneberg
TSV Sasel
Vorwärts/Wacker Billstedt 
Rasensport Elmshorn 
Wedeler TSV

To the Verbandsliga Schleswig-Holstein:
Husumer SV
TSV Kropp
SpVgg Flensburg 08
Heider SV

References

Sources
 Deutschlands Fußball in Zahlen,  An annual publication with tables and results from the Bundesliga to Verbandsliga/Landesliga. DSFS.
 Kicker Almanach,  The yearbook on German football from Bundesliga to Oberliga, since 1937. Kicker Sports Magazine.
 Die Deutsche Liga-Chronik 1945-2005  History of German football from 1945 to 2005 in tables. DSFS. 2006.

External links 
 Das deutsche Fussball Archiv  Historic German league tables
 The Hamburg Football Association (HFV)  
 The Schleswig-Holstein Football Association (SHFV)  
 Northern German Football Association (NFV) 

Ham
Football competitions in Hamburg
Football competitions in Schleswig-Holstein
1994 establishments in Germany
2004 disestablishments in Germany
Sports leagues established in 1994
Sports leagues disestablished in 2004
Ger